Pawlikowice may refer to the following places in Poland:
Pawlikowice, Lower Silesian Voivodeship (south-west Poland)
Pawlikowice, Kutno County in Łódź Voivodeship (central Poland)
Pawlikowice, Pabianice County in Łódź Voivodeship (central Poland)
Pawlikowice, Lesser Poland Voivodeship (south Poland)